{{safesubst:#invoke:RfD|||month = March
|day = 18
|year = 2023
|time = 01:48
|timestamp = 20230318014818

|content=
REDIRECT List of International Cricket Council members

}}

ICC members may refer to:
 List of International Cricket Council members
 States parties to the Rome Statute of the International Criminal Court

See also 
 ICC (disambiguation)